Jeffrey Ronald "Jeff" Janis (born June 24, 1991) is a former American football wide receiver. He played college football at Saginaw Valley State, and was drafted by the Green Bay Packers in the seventh round of the 2014 NFL Draft.

Early years
A native of Tawas City, Michigan, Janis attended Tawas Area High School. He was a member of both the football and basketball teams, and was an all-conference wide receiver who also played as a running back following an injury, and ended up leading his team in rushing.

College career
Janis attended Saginaw Valley State University from  2009 to 2013, and played for the Cardinals. After red-shirting in 2009, he caught 9 passes for 130 yards and one touchdown in 2010. In 2011, he appeared in all 11 games, starting eight and posted a team-high 968 receiving yards on 48 receptions (20.2 avg.) and 14 touchdowns. In 2012, he started all 11 games and was second in the nation with 106 receptions and led all DII players with 1,635 receiving yards, both of which set new SVSU single season marks. He caught 17 touchdown passes and was named a first-team All-GLIAC selection. In 2013, he caught 83 passes for 1,572 yards and 14 touchdowns. He earned himself first-team All-GLIAC honors, and was a first-team AFCA Div. II All-American.

For his collegiate career, Janis finished second in the history of the GLIAC with 4,305 receiving yards.

Janis was invited to play in the 2014 Senior Bowl.

College statistics

Professional career

Green Bay Packers
Janis was selected in the seventh round (236th overall) by the Green Bay Packers in the 2014 NFL Draft. Janis was the first Saginaw Valley State Cardinal drafted since offensive guard Todd Herremans in 2005, and the first wide receiver in school history to be drafted, though his early role on the team was more on the special teams rather than taking snaps at wide receiver.

Janis made his NFL debut on September 28, 2014 against the Chicago Bears, but he recorded no official statistics. In the next game against the Minnesota Vikings, he recorded two receptions for 16 yards. He appeared in one more game, which was against the Miami Dolphins, in the 2014 season.

In the 2015 season, Janis appeared in all 16 games in the regular season as a kick returner and backup receiver. His two receptions for 79 yards against the San Diego Chargers were his only receiving statistics for the regular season. He had a breakout game in the NFC divisional playoff game on January 16, 2016, against the Arizona Cardinals. He caught 7 passes for 145 yards and 2 touchdowns, including a 41-yard Hail Mary pass from Aaron Rodgers on the final play of regulation to bring the game into overtime. The Packers, however, lost 26-20 in overtime. 101 of these yards came on the game-tying drive to end regulation; he also caught a 60-yard pass on 4th and 20 from the Packers' 4-yard line to set up the tying score.

On August 10, 2016, Janis fractured at least one of the bones in his right hand during a ball-security drill at Packers training camp. He remained in a backup role in the 2016 season. He had a receiving touchdown against the Atlanta Falcons in a 33–32 loss. Overall, in the 2016 season, he recorded 11 receptions for 93 receiving yards and a receiving touchdown in addition to a 19-yard rushing touchdown, which occurred against the Seattle Seahawks. In the 2017 season, he recorded two receptions for 12 yards and three kick returns for 43 net yards.

Cleveland Browns

On March 30, 2018, Janis signed with the Cleveland Browns. On August 31, 2018, he was released.

NFL career statistics

Regular season

Postseason

After-football career
In April 2019, Janis bought Timmy Tire Center in East Tawas, Michigan, where he had been employed in high school and college, and renamed it Janis Tire and Auto.

References

External links
Green Bay Packers bio
Saginaw Valley State Cardinals bio

1991 births
Living people
Players of American football from Michigan
People from Iosco County, Michigan
American football wide receivers
Saginaw Valley State Cardinals football players
Green Bay Packers players
Cleveland Browns players